Anyer, also known as Anjer or Angier, is a coastal town in Banten, formerly West Java, Indonesia,  west of Jakarta and  south of Merak. A significant coastal town late 18th-century, Anyer faces the Sunda Strait.

History
The town was a considerable port in the 19th century, but was completely destroyed by a 100-foot-high tsunami which was caused by the 1883 eruption of Krakatoa. The present settlement still houses the Cikoneng Lighthouse built by Dutch government two years later as a memorial for the townspeople killed by the eruption. Off the coast of Anyer is the island Pulau Sangiang, an uninhabited island with vast areas of untouched jungle. The area is also known for coral formations swarming with tropical fish.

Anyer Beach is a tourist attraction with hot swimming water, a hotel and rental of resting sheds, boats, four-wheeled motorcycles, water scooter and a banana boat.

Plans around 2011 proposed that the Sunda Strait Bridge, an ambitious megaproject scheduled to start in 2014, would stretch from Anyer across the Sunda Strait to Lampung in South Sumatra.

References

Citations

Bibliography
 .

External links

 

Populated places in Banten